Danielle Elizabeth Downey (December 6, 1980 – January 30, 2014) was an American professional golfer. She won golf tournaments at the collegiate level, Sun Coast events and on the Futures Tour. She played on the LPGA Tour from 2006 to 2010.

High school
Downey was a 1,000 point scorer for the Spencerport High School girls basketball team and played on the boys varsity golf team.

College
Downey was a three time All-American and four-time All-SEC team at Auburn University. She won the 2000 SEC Championship. She led Auburn to the SEC team championships in 2000 and 2003. She was a two-time US vs. Japan team member.

Amateur career
Downey won the New York State Women's amateur golf tournament three consecutive years (1999–2001).

Professional
Downey played on the Futures Tour from 2004 to 2007 and the LPGA Tour from 2006 to 2010. She won one Futures Tour event, the Lima Memorial Hospital FUTURES Golf Classic. Her best finish on the LPGA Tour was 4th place at the 2008 Bell Micro LPGA Classic.

Death and legacy
Downey was killed in a single-vehicle crash on Lee County Route 57 approximately four miles outside of Auburn, Alabama on January 30, 2014. She lost control of her vehicle and it overturned several times before striking a tree. She was ejected from the vehicle. She was not wearing a seat belt. Alcohol was cited as a factor in the accident.

The 2015 Toyota Danielle Downey Classic, a tournament on the Symetra Tour, was held in Downey's honor at Brook Lea Country Club, where she was a member. Proceeds went to  benefit Downey's scholarship fund for young golfers.

Futures Tour wins
2004 Lima Memorial Hospital FUTURES Golf Classic

References

External links

Danielle Downey Classic official site

American female golfers
Auburn Tigers women's golfers
LPGA Tour golfers
Golfers from New York (state)
Golfers from Florida
Road incident deaths in Alabama
Sportspeople from Rochester, New York
Sportspeople from Clearwater, Florida
1980 births
2014 deaths